The Bachelors' Mosque, formerly known as the Sylejman Pasha Mosque, is a Cultural Monument in Berat City, Berat County, Albania. It became a Cultural Monument in 1961.

The mosque is located in the lower Mangalem neighborhood. It has two floors and arcades on three sides of it. The minaret of the mosque is low. The paintings inside the mosque date from the years 1927–1928. Since the times of the Communist dictatorship under Enver Hoxha, the portico (hajati) of the mosque is used as a store for women's underwear which can be seen as a disgrace to Islam.

See also
 Islam in Albania

References

Cultural Monuments of Albania
Mosques in Berat
Ottoman architecture in Albania
Religious buildings and structures completed in 1828